The men's 15 kilometre cross-country skiing competition at the 1980 Winter Olympics in Lake Placid, United States, was held on Sunday 17 February at the Mount Van Hoevenberg in Essex County, New York.

Favourites
Józef Łuszczek of Poland was the 1978 World champion and Nikolay Bazhukov of the Soviet Union was the defending champion from the 1976 Olympics in Innsbruck, Austria.

The Race
Each skier started at half a minute intervals, skiing the entire 15 kilometre course. The race developed into the closest duel in the history of cross-country skiing. Thomas Wassberg of Sweden and Finnish veteran Juha Mieto fought a tight battle for the gold medal. Wassberg started last of the 63 participants, half a minute behind Norwegian Ove Aunli. Mieto, wearing bib 54, started half a minute behind the reigning world champion at the distance, Polish skier Józef Łuszczek.

Wassberg started fast, and at the 5 km mark he had caught Aunli by 30 seconds and was in the lead, three seconds ahead of Mieto. Łuszczek also had a strong opener, only ten seconds behind the leader, closely followed by the 19-year old West German Jochen Behle and the 30 km winner Nikolay Zimyatov. At 10 km Wassberg had increased his lead to 4.8 seconds. Mieto, still in second place, had almost caught Łuszczek, starting half a minute in front of him, but the Pole was still in third place, now 30 seconds behind Wassberg. Aunli had been able to adjust his speed by following Wassberg and advanced from 13th to fifth place. Only two seconds separated the four fastest skiers behind Wassberg and Mieto 5 km from home. Behle had dropped down to ninth at 10 km and was out of contention for the medals.

Juha Mieto passed Łuszczek and left him behind before crossing the finish line in 41:57.64, beating Zimyatov's time by 36 seconds. Thomas Wassberg, still skiing together with Aunli, was told 500 m from home that he had a one second lead over Mieto, and, fighting desperately, crossed the finish line in 41:57.63. He won the race by the closest possible margin, one hundredth of a second. Aunli secured the bronze medal for Norway, beating Zimyatov by 5 seconds.

Aftermath
Wassberg proposed to Mieto that they could cut their medals in two parts and then melt them together as a mixed gold-silver medal. Mieto politely thanked him, but said no to the idea, and ended the 1980 season by winning the unofficial Cross-Country World Cup for the second consecutive time. The International Ski Federation (FIS) decided shortly after the 1980 Olympics that all times in cross-country races would henceforth be rounded to the nearest tenth of a second.

Results
Sources:

References

External links
 Final results (International Ski Federation)

Men's cross-country skiing at the 1980 Winter Olympics
Men's 15 kilometre cross-country skiing at the Winter Olympics